Free Guy is a 2021 American action comedy film directed and produced by Shawn Levy from a screenplay by Matt Lieberman and Zak Penn, and a story by Lieberman. The film stars Ryan Reynolds, Jodie Comer, Lil Rel Howery, Utkarsh Ambudkar, Joe Keery, and Taika Waititi. It tells the story of a bank teller who discovers that he is a non-player character in a massively multiplayer online game who then partners with a player to find evidence that a gaming company's CEO stole the player's game's source code. 

Lieberman began writing the script in 2016, which was acquired by 20th Century Studios shortly after. Levy passed on the script, but reconsidered after Hugh Jackman introduced him to Reynolds, resulting in him leaving the film adaptation of the Uncharted video game he had been developing. The acquisition of 21st Century Fox by Disney made Free Guy one of the first films produced by 20th Century to continue its production under Disney's ownership. Filming took place in Boston and Los Angeles between May and July 2019.

After the film was delayed two times by the COVID-19 pandemic, it premiered at the Piazza Grande section of the 74th Locarno Film Festival in Switzerland on August 10, 2021, and was released theatrically in the United States three days later on August 13 in RealD 3D, IMAX, 4DX and Dolby Cinema formats by 20th Century Studios. It grossed $331.5 million worldwide. The film received positive reviews from critics for the concept, comparing it to science fiction films and action video games such as Ready Player One, The Truman Show, The Matrix, Grand Theft Auto, and Fortnite. The film received a nomination for Best Visual Effects at the 94th Academy Awards. A sequel is in development.

Plot 
Free City is a massively multiplayer online role-playing video game (MMORPG) developed by Soonami Studios. The players of Free City are distinguished from NPCs by the sunglasses they wear, fighting each other, and causing mayhem. Unaware that the world they live in is a video game, the NPCs are mostly oblivious to the chaos caused by players while living out their scripted lives.

Guy is a non-player character (NPC) working as a bank teller at Free City's bank with his best friend, security guard Buddy. Unemployed software developer Millie is playing Free City to find proof that Soonami stole the source code from the concept game she developed, Life Itself, which included novel artificial intelligence techniques for its NPCs. Her friend Keys is sympathetic, but reluctant to help, as he now works in technical support at Soonami.

After Millie's avatar "MolotovGirl" catches Guy's attention by singing his favorite song "Fantasy", he begins to deviate from his programming, shocking Buddy by accidentally shooting a skull-masked player robbing the bank and leaving with his sunglasses. Believing Guy to be a hacker disguised as an NPC, Keys and his coworker Mouser unsuccessfully try to ban him from the game. Accessing the players' view of the game, Guy visits new areas and meets Millie at Revenjamin Buttons' stash house, where they attempt to steal evidence leading to her source code. Believing Guy to be a novice player, she advises him to level up before trying again. Guy rapidly progresses through the game by completing missions benevolently, standing out from other players and becoming a worldwide sensation known as "Blue Shirt Guy" while Soonami's CEO Antwan Hovachelik has the art nerds "roid up" his design for the sequel Free City 2. 

As Keys eventually realizes that Guy truly is an NPC, other NPCs that Guy interacts with also begin to develop self-awareness. Keys learns that Free City 2 is due to release in 48 hours and will completely replace Free City, terminating all of the game's NPCs. Keys informs Millie, she tells Guy the truth about his existence, but he becomes frustrated and breaks off contact. Guy talks with Buddy and realizes that there is something more to their reality. Buddy helps Guy to get the evidence Millie wanted from Revenjamin Buttons. Antwan sees that the popularity of Blue Shirt Guy threatens his plans to launch Free City 2 and orders a server reboot, which resets Guy's memories. Guy regains his self-awareness when Millie kisses him. 

Guy recalls the location of an island containing remnants of the Life Itself source code and they attempt to reach the island before the Free City 2 launch wipes all old content from the servers. Antwan fires Keys, has every player removed from Free City, and sends an unfinished Guy-resembling character named Dude into the game. Initially overwhelmed, Guy puts the sunglasses on Dude, distracting him and allowing Guy to proceed to the island. In a last-ditch attempt to stop him, Antwan begins smashing the game servers in the Soonami offices with a fire axe, erasing Buddy and much of the game world, while firing Mouser. Before he can destroy the final server, Millie offers a deal to abandon her lawsuit and surrender the profits of the Free City franchise to him in exchange for her creation.

Sometime later, sales for Free City 2 have slipped because of bugs in the code and lagging online play. An embattled Antwan is in the crosshairs, but claims he is a "victim". Meanwhile, Millie salvages her code and releases the indie game Free Life, which includes Guy, Dude, and the other NPCs from Free City can continue to live. In the game, Guy reveals to Millie that his code is, in fact, a love letter to her from Keys. During the development of Life Itself, Keys had encoded what he knew about her tastes into an AI routine in the game, which was eventually incorporated into Free City. This explains why Guy felt uniquely drawn to MolotovGirl. After Millie leaves the game, she and Keys share a kiss. Meanwhile, Guy and Dude reunite with Buddy who was reconstructed.

Cast 

 Ryan Reynolds as Guy / Blue Shirt Guy, a bank teller and non-player character (NPC) in Free City who is initially unaware that he is a video game character.
 Reynolds also provides the uncredited voice and facial motion capture for Dude, an incomplete muscular version of Guy with a blue shirt tattoo on his chest that was made for Free City 2. Dude is physically portrayed by bodybuilder Aaron W. Reed.
 Jodie Comer as Millie Rusk, a player looking inside the game for source code to her original game Life Itself, which she co-developed with Keys. In Free City, her avatar is MolotovGirl. Comer wore a short dark-brown wig when portraying MolotovGirl.
 Lil Rel Howery as Buddy, a Free City bank security guard and Guy's best friend.
 Joe Keery as Walter "Keys" McKey, a developer for Soonami Studios' technical support department and a Massachusetts Institute of Technology (MIT) graduate who co-developed Life Itself with Millie. In Free City, his avatar is described as a "dirty stripper cop".
 Utkarsh Ambudkar as Mouser, a developer and Keys' co-worker at Soonami Studios' technical support department. In Free City, his avatar is a police officer in a muscular rabbit suit.
 Taika Waititi as Antwan Hovachelik, the ruthless and narcissistic founder and CEO of Soonami Studios who stole the source code for Life Itself to make Free City with plans to have it replaced with Free City 2.
 Channing Tatum as Revenjamin Buttons, an avatar in Free City who owns a stash house that Guy and MolotovGirl try to break into to obtain incriminating data involving Life Itself.
 Matty Cardarople as Keith, a 22-year-old gamer who plays Free City as Revenjamin Buttons.

Recurring NPCs in Free City include Britne Oldford as Missy, a barista; Camille Kostek as the bombshell that was originally associated with Revenjamin Buttons and bank robber #3 before befriending Missy; Mark Lainer as a bank hostage who always has his hands up; Mike Devine as Officer Johnny, a police officer that Guy knows; Sophie Levy as a big city dreamer; Vernon Scott as the manager of the bank that Guy and Buddy work at who would get attacked by bank robbers as part of a Free City bonus; Naheem Garcia as Joe, a convenience store owner whose store is always robbed by the players while being thrown through his window; Anabel Graetz as Phyllis, an elderly cat lady who needs help finding her cats; Ric Plamenco as an ice cream vendor in the part of Free City where no quests are; Kenneth Israel as a businessman; Michael Malvesti as a newsstand vendor; Michael Tow as a man who quotes "looks like rain"; Colin Allen as a shoe store clerk; and Bob Gilliam as a news anchor at FCNN (short for Free City News Network).

Soonami Studios' staff include Jonathan De Azevedo as Jonathan, the personal assistant of Antwan; Destiny Claymore as one of the art nerds at Soonami Studios that develop Dude; Minh-Ahn Day as a Soonami Studios employee that informs Antwan that no retailer will carry their bloody zombie video game due to concerns about its nature; and Jose Guns Alves as a Soonami Studios security guard.

The film features cameo appearances from gamers and streamers Jacksepticeye, Ninja, Pokimane, DanTDM, and LazarBeam who, in the film, provide commentary on Guy and Free City on their respective YouTube and Twitch channels from their own perspectives.

Actor Chris Evans and Good Morning America host Lara Spencer make cameo appearances as themselves. Jeopardy! host Alex Trebek makes a posthumous cameo appearance in his final film role after his death on November 8, 2020.

Other voice roles in the film include Hugh Jackman as a masked avatar in an alley (physically portrayed by Patrick Vincent Curran) who MolotovGirl gets the location to Revenjamin Buttons' stash house from, Dwayne Johnson as bank robber #2 (physically portrayed by Owen Burke) whom Guy accidentally shoots while trying to claim his sunglasses, Tina Fey as Keith's mother (portrayed by Regina Taufen) who was vacuuming in the background, and John Krasinski as a silhouetted gamer (physically portrayed by Rosario Corso) who comments about Guy and the NPCs alongside the previously-mentioned gamers and streamers.

Production

Development 

In August 2016, Matt Lieberman spent three weeks writing the first draft of the spec script for Free Guy. This was sold and entered development at 20th Century Fox prior to being acquired by The Walt Disney Company. Free Guy is one of the first Fox films to continue production under Disney's ownership, as well as under the studio's new name of 20th Century Studios. Director Shawn Levy read the script in 2016 but passed on it. After he was introduced to Ryan Reynolds by Hugh Jackman, a mutual friend, Levy and Reynolds later decided to work on Free Guy after rereading it together. Reynolds, who also produced the film, said, "I haven't been this fully immersed and engaged in something since Deadpool." In order to help Reynolds fully tap into his Guy character after Deadpool, Levy suggested that he tapped into his Canadian background and act very friendly, full of joy, a typical Canadian citizen. He also found inspiration in Peter Sellers role in Being There and Will Ferrell role in Elf because they played characters who were similar to Guy's character being simple-minded. Levy had previously been attached to the film Uncharted, an adaptation of the video game series of the same name, before he left to make Free Guy.

Filming 
Principal photography began on May 14, 2019, in Boston, mostly around the city's Financial District. It also took place in the Massachusetts cities of Worcester, Framingham (in the former Framingham Savings Bank building), and Weymouth (at the former Naval Air Station), as well as at Revere Beach and the Paramount Pictures studio headquarters in Los Angeles, California. Filming concluded on July 31, 2019.

Design and cultural references 
Levy decided to hire production designer Ethan Tobman over other candidates with more feature film experience after being inspired by the energy he brought to the project. Together they created a visual bible laying out the rules for their video game world. To split the real world from the in-game look they specified colors, lenses, composition and framing, camera movement, and other details. Levy found it liberating to be influenced by other games and films but not required to make a direct adaptation of an existing franchise. Tobman said the film's game-world design drew primary inspiration from games like SimCity, The Sims and Red Dead Redemption 2, while also acknowledging thematic inspiration from Grand Theft Auto and Fortnite.

The film features several weapons from other video game and film franchises, including a Mega Buster from Mega Man, a lightsaber from Star Wars, one of Fortnite pickaxes, the gravity gun from Half-Life 2, the portal gun from Portal, as well as Captain America's shield and Hulk's fist from the Marvel Cinematic Universe. When the film was acquired by Disney, which owns the Marvel and Star Wars franchises, the filmmakers made a request to use iconic weapons from those properties, and were granted permission to use everything they requested. The cameo by Chris Evans was suggested by Reynolds' wife Blake Lively. Levy contacted Evans, who was already in Boston shooting Defending Jacob and asked if he would come by for ten minutes, and he agreed.

Music 
The film's score was composed by Christophe Beck. Portions of the film's score are sampled from the Disney animated short film Paperman, which Beck had previously scored. Levy had originally intended to use the song "Your Love" by the Outfield, but Reynolds suggested using "Fantasy" by Mariah Carey instead. Reynolds talked to Carey about obtaining permission to use it and she allowed them to use the song throughout the film. A cover version of "Fantasy" sung by Comer was also used in the film.

Marketing 
When promoting the film in 2019, Reynolds and Waititi joked that it was nice to work together for the first time, pretending that they knew nothing about the Green Lantern film. In July 2021, Reynolds released a video on YouTube titled Deadpool and Korg React, in which he reprised his role as Wade Wilson/Deadpool from the X-Men film series and Waititi reprised his role as Korg from the Marvel Cinematic Universe reacting to the trailer to Free Guy.

On August 12, 2021, Dude became a purchasable outfit in the video game Fortnite alongside a series of optional quests placed into the game to allow players to unlock an emote with Reynolds's voice. Free Guys marketing team created parody posters in the style of other video games, including Super Mario 64, Minecraft, Among Us, Grand Theft Auto: Vice City, Mega Man, Street Fighter II, Doom, and Animal Crossing: New Horizons.

Release

Theatrical 
Free Guy was released in the United States on August 13, 2021 in RealD 3D, IMAX, 4DX and Dolby Cinema formats. It was the first film from Walt Disney Studios during the COVID-19 pandemic released exclusively to theaters for 45 days before releasing on streaming services. The film was initially scheduled to be released on July 3, 2020, but it was delayed because of the pandemic. It was then moved to December 11, 2020. In November 2020, the studio removed the film, along with Death on the Nile, from its upcoming release schedule until further notice. The next month, the film was rescheduled to May 21, 2021. In March, Ryan Reynolds announced that Free Guy was delayed to its August date. The film premiered at the Piazza Grande section of the 74th Locarno Film Festival in Switzerland in August 2021.

Home media 
Free Guy was released on digital on September 28, 2021, 45 days after its theatrical release, and was released on 4K, DVD, and Blu-ray by Walt Disney Studios Home Entertainment on October 12, two months after its theatrical release. It was added to Disney+ and HBO Max in the United States on February 23, 2022. According to Samba TV, the film was watched by 2.5 million US households in its first five days of streaming on Disney+ and HBO Max. According to the streaming aggregator Justwatch, Free Guy was the most streamed film across all platforms in the United States, during the week ending February 27, 2022.

Reception

Box office 
Free Guy grossed $121.6 million in the United States and Canada, and $209.9 million in other territories, for a worldwide total of $331.5 million.

In the United States and Canada, Free Guy was released alongside Respect and Don't Breathe 2, and was initially projected to gross $15–18 million from 4,165 theaters in its opening weekend. However, after making $10.5 million on its first day (including $2.2 million from Thursday-night previews), estimates were raised to $26 million. It went on to debut to $28.4 million, topping the box office. The film made $18.5 million in its second weekend, remaining in first. The drop of just 34% marked the smallest second-weekend decline of any wide release of the summer, and the second-best of Reynolds' career. In its third weekend, it was beaten by newcomer Candyman, but the film continued to hold well, falling by 27% earning $13.6 million.

Critical response 
The website's critics consensus reads, "Combining a clever concept, sweet, self-aware humor, and a charming cast, Free Guy is frivolous fun." On Metacritic, the film has a weighted average score of 62 out of 100 based on 51 critics, indicating "generally favorable reviews." Audiences polled by CinemaScore gave the film an average grade of "A" on an A+ to F scale.

Peter Debruge of Variety magazine called the film an "at-times unwieldy mashup of multiple-reality blockbusters like The Matrix and The Lego Movie" and said that "Free Guy is a lot of fun, despite the fact that Levy and the screenwriters seem to be changing the rules as they go." Richard Roeper of the Chicago Sun-Times lauded both the "perfectly cast" Reynolds and "superb and charming Jodie Comer." Giving the film three out of four stars, he wrote "Thanks in large part to the vibrant, funny, sweet, endearing work by Reynolds and Comer, Free Guy delivers."
A.A. Dowd of The A.V. Club gave the film a C+ grade and said, "For all its casual mayhem, Free Guy turns out to be a rather cuddly crowdpleaser, a high-concept blockbuster trifle with bubblegum ice cream clogging its circuits." Dowd contrasted the film with The Truman Show, saying "Reynolds replicates that slightly unhinged Truman Burbank grin but not the desperation behind it." Nick De Semlyen of Empire was critical of the film; he compared it unfavorably to 2018's Ready Player One, and said that although it is "eager to please" it "doesn't really hang together, even as you're watching it.".

Accolades

Sequel 
On August 14, 2021, following the film's successful first-day box-office gross, Reynolds confirmed that Disney wanted a sequel. In March 2022, Steve Asbell, president of 20th Century Studios, said a script was being submitted shortly and called the sequel "a fantastic story".

References

External links 
 
 

2021 films
2021 action comedy films
2021 science fiction action films
2020s English-language films
2020s science fiction comedy films
2020s American films
20th Century Studios films
21 Laps Entertainment films
4DX films
American action comedy films
American science fiction action films
American science fiction comedy films
Films about video games
Films about virtual reality
Films directed by Shawn Levy
Films postponed due to the COVID-19 pandemic
Films produced by Greg Berlanti
Films produced by Ryan Reynolds
Films scored by Christophe Beck
Films set in the future
Films shot in Boston
Films shot in Massachusetts
Films with screenplays by Matt Lieberman
Films with screenplays by Zak Penn
IMAX films
Existentialist films
Self-reflexive films
TSG Entertainment films
Works set in computers